William Aston (1916–1997) was an Australian politician.

William Aston may also refer to:

 William Aston (Jesuit) (1735–1800), English Jesuit
 Bill Aston (1900–1974), British racing driver
 William George Aston (1841–1911), British scholar of Japan
 William Aston (Irish judge) (1613–1671), English-born barrister, politician and soldier
 William Aston (MP for Liskeard), see Liskeard

See also
 Francis William Aston (1877–1945), British chemist and physicist